John Fifer was an American Negro league pitcher in the 1920s.

Fifer played for the Indianapolis ABCs in 1921. In five recorded appearances on the mound, he posted a 5.45 ERA over 33 innings.

References

External links
 and Seamheads

Year of birth missing
Year of death missing
Place of birth missing
Place of death missing
Indianapolis ABCs players